HRMC may refer to:

Hospitals:
Healthmark Regional Medical Center, a hospital in Florida, US
Highlands Regional Medical Center, a hospital in Kentucky, US
Highlands Regional Medical Center (Sebring), a hospital in Florida, US

Other:
 the Hasaka Revolutionary Military Council of the Free Syrian Army
 Higher Rate Mobility Component of the Disability Living Allowance, a type of disability benefit in the United Kingdom
Hybrid Reverse Monte Carlo, a mathematical modelling technique

See also 
 HM Revenue and Customs (HMRC)